Liptena amabilis is a butterfly in the family Lycaenidae. It is found in Cameroon, the Republic of the Congo, the Democratic Republic of the Congo, Uganda and Tanzania. The habitat consists of forests.

Subspecies
Liptena amabilis amabilis (Cameroon, Congo, Democratic Republic of the Congo)
Liptena amabilis nyanzae Congdon, Kielland & Collins, 1998 (Uganda: western shores of Lake Victoria, Tanzania: north-west to the shores of Lake Victoria)

References

Butterflies described in 1923
Liptena